Lete may refer to:
 Lete (Mygdonia) an ancient city in Mygdonia, Macedon
 Lete, Nepal, a village in Nepal
 Xabier Lete (1944–2010), Basque writer, poet, singer and politician
 Lete, the proper name of exoplanet HD 102195 b
 A leat, a type of watercourse

See also 
 Leti (disambiguation)
 Leyte (disambiguation)
 Lite (disambiguation)
 Liti (disambiguation)
 Lity (disambiguation)